Roos Theuws (Valkenswaard, 1957) is a Dutch media and video artist.

Life 
Roos Theuws studied from 1974 to 1979 in Tilburg to become a Tehatex teacher (also known as "Tekenen, Handvaardigheid en Textiele werkvormen"). From 1981 to 1983 she went to the Jan van Eyck Academie in Maastricht. With the Stichting Time Based Arts, founded in 1983, she aimed to make the form of video art to be recognized by museums and galleries at the same level as other art mediums. Roos Theuws was closely related to the Association of Video Artists who helped shape the creation of Montevideo / Time Based Arts in 1986. It became the national centre for media art in the Netherlands and supported the creation of video art in a period when the Dutch video art movement was still struggling with the challenges of acknowledging video art as an art form. Since 1995 she teaches in Amsterdam at the Fine Arts departement of the Gerrit Rietveld Academie.

Reception within the Netherlands (notable group exhibitions)

Negen (Nine) 
Witte de With organized the group exhibition Negen (Nine) in 1991 to present the qualities of contemporary art in the Netherlands at the time. Chris Dercon and Gosse Oosterhof who curated the exhibition, stated that there was little in Dutch art to get excited about. The artworks in the show were exceptions and transcended “such vague notions as regionalism and nationalism.” After its debut in Rotterdam the exhibition travelled to three other venues in Europe: the Museo d’Arte Contemporanea Luigi Pecci in Prato, the Kunstverein in Düsseldorf and the Provinciaal Museum in Hasselt.

According to Lynne Cooke most participating artists were involved in continuing a longstanding tradition centering in on seventeenth-century Dutch art. The art historian referenced The Art of Describing: Dutch Art in the Seventeenth Century by Svetlana Alpers. Among other artworks Forma Lucis III (1986), Forma Lucis IX (1989) and Untitled (So That I Can Build For Him A House no. 4) (1990) by Roos Theuws were part of the exhibition. Lynne Cooke claimed the visual inspection, empirical curiosity and the objective scrutiny of the eye explored in the artworks were “directed to ends that bypass symbol and allegory, leaving apprehension in the realm of sensation, of the seen.” Curator Jan van Adrichem claimed that the installations by Roos Theuws expressed the artist's interest in the visual properties of light.

IMAGO, fin de siècle in Dutch art 
Forma Lucis VI (1989) by Roos Theuws was part of the exhibition IMAGO. It was a traveling exhibition, financed by the Rijksdienst Beeldende Kunst (The Netherlands Office for Fine Arts), about contemporary art and technology. For the exhibition, René Coelho brought together the work of 14 Dutch artists who all believed that the creative potential of contemporary technology should be explored. At the end of the twentieth century artists wanted to show that the "efficient, dominating and massifying products of electronics" could be used for more beautiful and imaginative purposes. These artworks were shown in venues in Switzerland, Japan, Slovakia, Hungary, Portugal, Spain and Taiwan.

The catalogue of the exhibition contains a dialogue between sociologist and media researcher Volker Grassmuck and economist and philosopher Asada Akira. The latter argues that contemporary media art consisted of a critical analysis of the system of representation. According to Asada Akirta the relationship between contemporary art and technology was similar to the relationship in the seventeenth century between the artworks by Vermeer and the research by Christiaan Huyghens and Van Leeuwenhoek who laid the foundation for optics.

Collaborations 
Roos Theuws worked with Kasia Glowicka, who composed music for the artwork CONVOLUTION KERNEL II (2008). The collaboration also went the other way, with Glowicka's live performance Quasi Rublev (2009) being accompanied by visuals from video artists, including by Roos Theuws. Also was the composition Luminescence (2009) inspired by Roos Theuws' concept of light.

The departement of optics at Universiteit van Amsterdam are credited for their help for in an artwork from 1984. To make the artwork Kitab al Manazir (2014), Roos Theuws worked with the collection from the science museum Museum Boerhaave.

Overview of artworks

Exhibitions

Solo exhibitions

Group exhibitions

Artist books 
Greenish (1983), loose leaves, 24 x 20 cm.

Binntal (2021), MunkenPolar paper, Glama paper, 84p, Swiss binding, (ZwaanLenoir) 29,5 x 21 cm.

List of Literature 
Alphen, Ernst van. “Slow Seeing. Grasping the Image and the Way We Process It.” Roos Theuws, 2014.

Alphen, Ernst van. “Traag kijken: beeldontleding door Roos Theuws.” De Witte Raaf, juli-augustus 2014.

Bal, Mieke. "Activating Temporalities: The Political Power of Artistic Time" Open Cultural Studies 2, no. 1 (2018): 84-102. https://doi.org/10.1515/culture-2018-0009

Bal, Mieke. “Roos Theuws.” Art in America, September 25, 2014. ARTnews.com.

Coelho, Nio, Possel, Rodrigo, Velthoven (1990). IMAGO, fin de siècle dutch contemporary art. Amsterdam: Rijksdienst Beeldende Kunst/Stichting Mediamatic Foundation.

Fuchs, Rudi. “Stille aandacht.” De Groene Amsterdammer, September 14, 2016.

Massiac, Alix de. “40 Jaar Metropolis M – In gesprek met Roos Theuws.” Metropolis M, October 16, 2019. www.metropolism.com

References 

1957 births
Dutch video artists
People from Valkenswaard
Academic staff of Gerrit Rietveld Academie
Living people